The 1984–85 South Midlands League season was 56th in the history of South Midlands League.

Premier Division

The Premier Division featured 11 clubs which competed in the division last season, along with 5 new clubs:
New Bradwell St. Peter, promoted from last season's Division One
Brache Sparta, promoted from last season's Division One
Knebworth, promoted from last season's Division One
Leighton Town, promoted from last season's Division One
Hoddesdon Town, joined from the defunct Athenian League

League table

Division One

The Division One featured 10 clubs which competed in the division last season, along with 4 new clubs:
Walden Rangers, relegated from Premier Division
Milton Keynes Borough, transferred from the Hellenic League Division One
Milton Keynes United, joined from North Bucks League
Ickleford, joined from North Herts League

League table

References

1984–85
8